The 2017 European Le Mans Series season was the fourteenth season of the Automobile Club de l'Ouest's (ACO) European Le Mans Series. The six-event season began at Silverstone Circuit, in conjunction with the FIA World Endurance Championship, on 15 April and ended at Algarve International Circuit on 22 October.

Regulations
The 2017 season sees new regulations regarding the LMP2 class introduced. Teams are able to choose from four different chassis constructors: Dallara, Onroak Automotive (Ligier), Oreca and a joint-venture between Riley Technologies/Multimatic. Gibson Technology is the exclusive engine supplier for the class, with all cars equipped with a 4.2-litre, normally-aspirated V8 engine, producing approximately 600hp. Cosworth Electronics is also the exclusive electronics supplier.

The aim of the new regulations is to ensure long-term success for the category with a reduction in costs and the guarantee of stable regulations.

Provisional calendar
The provisional 2017 calendar was announced at 23 September 2016. The calendar comprises six events, featuring the same four circuits that hosted events in 2016 and for the first time since 2008 and 2010 it included events at Monza and Algarve respectively, which are stand-alone events. For the fifth consecutive season, Silverstone hosts the opening rounds of both the European Le Mans Series and the FIA World Endurance Championship. While other rounds are collaboration with 2017 Eurocup Formula Renault 2.0.

Entry list
The provisional entry list was announced on 2 February 2017.

LMP2
In accordance with the new LMP2 regulations for 2017, all cars utilise the Gibson GK428 4.2 L V8 engine.

LMP3
All cars utilise the Nissan VK50VE 5.0 L V8 engine and Michelin tyres.

LMGTE
All teams will use Dunlop tyres.

Results and standings

Race results
Bold indicates overall winner.

To be classified a car will have to cross  the  finish  line  on  the  race  track  when the  chequered  flag  is  shown,  except  in  a  case  of force majeure at the Stewards’ discretion and have  covered  at  least  70% (the  official  number  of  laps  will  be  rounded down to the nearest whole number) of the  distance  covered  by  the  car  classified  in  first  place  in  the overall classification.

Teams Championships
Points are awarded according to the following structure:

LMP2 Teams Championship

LMP3 Teams Championship

LMGTE Teams Championship

Drivers Championships
Points are awarded according to the following structure:

LMP2 Drivers Championship

LMP3 Drivers Championship

LMGTE Drivers Championship

References

External links
 

European Le Mans Series seasons
European Le Mans Series
Le Mans Series